Saad El-Haddad (born 26 November 1985), better known by his stage names Baba Saad or just Saad, is a German rapper of Lebanese descent.

Early life
Baba Saad was born in Beirut, Lebanon, but emigrated to Syke in northern Germany in 1994.

Career
In early 2005, Saad was featured alongside Bushido in the joint album Carlo Cokxxx Nutten 2. In the summer of 2005, he got signed to Bushido's label ersguterjunge.  At the end of 2005, he was featured on Bushido's album Staatsfeind Nr. 1.

In the spring of 2006, Saad released his own album, called Das Leben ist Saad ("Life is Saad").

In March 2011, he joined newcomer Haftbefehl at a concert and announced after the performance that he had left ersguterjunge. In an interview, he later stated that there were creative differences between him and the label. Moving on, he founded his own record label called Halunkenbande. But just a few months after signing the rappers Dú Maroc and SadiQ, Saad announced that he couldn't focus on the label at the moment because of a stroke of fate that caused him to move back to Lebanon.

After his return to Germany in 2013—Dú Maroc and SadiQ had meanwhile been dropped by the label—Saad continued both his career and the label management, signing EstA and Punch Arogunz.

In April 2013, his latest solo album S Doppel A D was released.

Discography

Solo albums 
 2005: Carlo Cokxxx Nutten II (with Bushido a.k.a. Sonny Black)
 2006: Das Leben ist Saad
 2008: Saadcore
 2011: Halunke
 2013: S Doppel A D
 2013: Beuteschema (with EstA and Punch Arogunz)
 2014: Das Leben ist Saadcore
 2017: Yayo Tape II

Singles
 2005: "Nie ein Rapper" (with Bushido a.k.a. Sonny Black) (Carlo Cokxxx Nutten II)
 2006: "Womit hab ich das verdient" (Das Leben ist Saad)
 2008: "Hier geht es nicht um dich" (Saadcore)
 2008: "Regen" (feat. Bushido) (Saadcore)

Other releases and free tracks

References

External links
Official website (archived)
Fan site (archived)

1985 births
Living people
German rappers
Musicians from Beirut
Lebanese emigrants to Germany
German people of Lebanese descent